Allocryptopine is a bioactive alkaloid found in plants of the Papaveraceae family, including Glaucium arabicum Argemone mexicana , Eschscholtzia , Corydalis , Fumaria , Chelidonium , Hunnemannia fumariifolia Eschscholzia lobbii  and more other Papaveraceae plants.

See also
Cryptopine

References

Alkaloids
Benzodioxoles
Tertiary amines
Ketones